The  was a seasonal overnight Rapid service operated by East Japan Railway Company (JR East), which ran between Shinjuku and Hakuba Station via the Chūō Main Line, Shinonoi Line, and Ōito Line. The service started in 2002, and is operated using 6- or 9-car 183 series or 189 series EMUs. While JR East has not formally announced its discontinuation, no services have operated since December 30, 2018.

Route
The main station stops for the Moonlight Shinshū service were as follows, although the exact stopping patterns vary depending on the time of year.
 Shinjuku - Tachikawa - Hachiōji - Takao - Ōtsuki - Enzan - Kōfu - Kobuchizawa - Fujimi - Chino - Kami-Suwa - Shimo-Suwa - Okaya - Shiojiri - Matsumoto - Shinano-Ōmachi - Hakuba

Formations

See also
 List of named passenger trains of Japan

References 
 JR Timetable, March 2008 issue

East Japan Railway Company
Named passenger trains of Japan
Night trains of Japan
2002 establishments in Japan
Railway services introduced in 2002
Railway services discontinued in 2018
2018 disestablishments in Japan